Rottenmann (Central Bavarian: Rottnmau) is a town in Styria in Austria, near the Rottenmanner Tauern. Rottenmann was first referred to in a document in 927. It received its town charter in 1279 from King Rudolf von Habsburg.

Name
The name Rottenmann is a semi-translation of old Slavic *čьrmьn′ane, ultimately derived from the adjective *čьrmьnъ 'red' (cf. German rot 'red'). The place name was recorded in 1048 as Cirminah, derived from the hydronym *Čьrmьna 'red (river)'.

Population

References

External links
 Rottenmann

Cities and towns in Liezen District
Rottenmann and Wölz Tauern